Mark 7 torpedo may refer to:
 Bliss-Leavitt Mark 7 torpedo
 Short Mark 7 torpedo, a variant of the Bliss-Leavitt Mark 7 torpedo